Mazhar Khan (18 October 1905 – 24 September 1950) was an actor-producer-director in Indian Cinema. He was widely known for his natural performances. He started his career as a police officer, which he left to study law for a short period. Abandoning his studies he came to Bombay and started his career in cinema with the silent film Fatal Garland opposite the top actress of the time, Ermeline. He became a popular actor, gaining success in several silent films. During his stint in silent films he worked with well-established directors like Bhagwati Mishra, Ezra Mir, Moti P. Bhagnani, R. S. Chowdhary, and M. D. Bhavnani. The magazines of those days, circa 1940s, compared Mazhar to Hollywood actors like Paul Muni, Bela Lugosi and Boris Karloff.

Mazhar Khan made a successful transition to Talkies with the end of the Silent Era. Nurjehan (1931), directed by Ezra Mir, was his first Talkie picture. It received a positive response from the audiences establishing Mazhar as a profitable and dependable actor. He went on to work with the East India Film Company in Calcutta and Sagar Movietone, making films like Sultana, Night Bird, Salima and Sonhera Sansar. He then moved back to Bombay and worked under Ranjit Movietone. Having established himself in the different roles, he became renowned for his character depictions while also being respected in the film industry.

He formed his own production company, Asiatic Pictures under the banner of which he first made Yaad (1942) and then Pehli Nazar (1945), the latter film referred to as his best directorial triumph in his obituary. He introduced actress Veena in Yaad and Munawwar Sultana as a lead heroine in Pehli Nazar. His last role was in Usha Kiran.

Early life
Mazhar Khan was born on 18 October 1905, at Bareilly, Uttar Pradesh, India. He matriculated in Indore, Madhya Pradesh and then joined the police force in Dhar State. He rose to the rank of a sub-inspector before quitting. Following his father's wishes he studied law but soon left that to move to Bombay and pursue a career in film. His tenure with the police trained him in horse riding and other "athletic abilities", which were proved helpful to him in his cinematic career.

In an interview (January 1942, Filmindia) Mazhar stated that the glamour of the Indian screen attracted him, with his interest in films growing with each new picture he saw. His desire to act in films drove him to a "frenzy", and he "rushed to Bombay, the Mecca of films". Mazhar's entrance into films was hard, and he had to venture from one studio to another for work. According to Baburao Patel of Filmindia, B. P. Mishra was the first to recognise the "potential box-office attraction in the young fugitive". Within a week Mazhar Khan was given a role in Fatal Garland, a "costume phantasy".

Career

Silent films
Mazhar's debut film was Fatal Garland, directed by Bhagwati Prasad Mishra (B. P. Mishra/Bhagwati Mishra) and starring Ermeline, who was called the "queen of silent films". His role as Prince Ghiasudin was appreciated and he was inundated with films. His other films from 1926-1931 during the silent era include Durgesh Nandini (1926), Hoor-E-Baghdad (1928), Vasl Ni Raat, Be Dhaari Talwar (1929), Ram Rahim (1930), Hamara Hindustan (1930), Sinbad the Sailor (1930), Raj Tilak (1931) and Golibar (1931). Durgesh Nandini was directed by Bhagwati Prasad Mishra (B. P. Mishra) for Sudarshan Films and starred Ermeline and Madanrai Vakil. In his initial phase, he acted the villain in stunt films produced in that era. With the trend shifting to "mythological, historical and semi-social", he performed roles that required "a touch of extra realism".

In 1927-28, Mazhar did two films. The one in 1927 for Imperial Film Company was Gamdeni Gori also known as Village Girl. It was directed by Mohan Dayaram Bhavnani (M. D. Bhavnani) and co-starred Sulochana, Madanrai Vakil and Raja Sandow. The film is stated to be a "part of Imperial's calculated and successful effort to manufacture a star image for the actress (Sulochana)". 1928 was Hoor-E-Baghdad directed by Bhagwati Mishra. 1929 had five films starring Mazhar, variously directed by Mishra, Bhavnani and Altekar, with the production company remaining Imperial.

In 1930, he acted in six films five of which were for Imperial and one for Sagar Film Company. Cinema Girl, which was termed a "Modern Girl" social genre, was directed by Bhagwati Mishra for Imperial Film Company and co-starred Prithviraj Kapoor and Ermeline. It "presented a fictionalised biography of its maker". The film also marked the debut of actor Prithviraj Kapoor in a prominent role; his first film being Do Dhaari Talwar directed by Mishra.

Talkies

1930sNurjehan (1931) was his debut Talkie film. It was made by the Imperial Film Company and directed by Ezra Mir. The film starred Vimala, Mubarak, Nayampally and Jilloobai with Mazhar. The music director was Joseph David. The film "established" Mazhar in Talkies. In 1932 he acted with actor-singer K. L. Saigal and Kumar in Subah Ka Sitara produced by New Theatres Ltd., Calcutta, and directed by Premankur Atorthy. Saigal was a new entry in the film industry and had made two film prior to this.

In 1933, Mazhar acted in films produced by East India Film Company: Nala Damayanti was directed by B. H. Rajhans and had Mazhar starring along with Mukhtar Begum, Krishna Chandra Dey, Indubala. Ek Din Ka Badshah also called King For A Day was again directed by Rajhans and had Sabita Devi, Indubala, and Bachan as co-stars. Aurat Ka Pyar a.k.a. A Woman's Love was directed by A. R. Kardar and starred Gul Hamid, Mukhtar Begum, Anwaribai and Bachan. Mushtaq Ahmed composed the music and lyrics were by Agha Hashar Kashmiri, who also scripted the film.

In 1934-1935, Mazhar acted in several films with Chandragupta (1934) a historical directed by A. R. Kardar, becoming a commercial success at the box-office, and Kardar being termed as a "talented film-maker". The film co-starred Nazir in the title role of Chandragupta, along with Sabita Devi and Gul Hamid. The other significant films of 1933 were Sultana, Mumtaz Begum and Night Bird all produced by East India Film Company. His four films in 1935 were Sulagto Sansar a.k.a. Murderer directed by G. R. Sethi, Step Mother a.k.a. Sauteli Ma by S. D. Kerawala, Selima by Modhu Bose and Bidrohi a.k.a. Freedom Fighter by Dhirendranath Ganguly.

1936 had Mazhar Khan enacting a significant role along with Gul Hamid in Baghi Sipahi, an adaptation of Cardinal Richelieu (1935). A costume action drama, it was directed by A. R. Kardar and co-starred Bimla Kumari and Lalita. In 1939, Mazhar was shown as a businessman interested in crossword puzzles in the film Aap Ki Marzi. Directed by Sarvottam Badami, it co-starred Sabita Devi and Motilal. It was based on the Edward Buzzell directed film Paradise for Three (1938) from Erich Kastner's novel.

1940s
In 1940, Mazhar played an important role in Achhut, a film made to "promote Gandhi's movement against untouchability". The cast included Motilal, Gohar Sitara Devi, and Noor Mohammed Charlie. It was produced by Chandulal Shah for his Ranjit Studios. The premiere was attended by Sardar Vallabhbhai Patel. In Bharosa, Mazhar played the role of a man who leaves his wife (Sardar Akhtar, in the care of his trusted friend (Chandra Mohan) and his wife, when he has to go abroad on work. The resulting consequences form the basis of the story. The film was directed by Sohrab Modi for Minerva Movietone.

In 1941, Mazhar acted in Padosi, directed by V. Shantaram for his Prabhat Film Company. It was made following communal tension at the formation of Muslim League. The film showed friendly relations between the Hindus and the Muslims. To achieve a better coalition, Shantaram had Mazhar Khan, a Muslim, playing the role of a Hindu and Gajanan Jagirdar, a Hindu, play the Muslim character. Mazhar's role as 'Thakur" was claimed to be a difficult one, requiring "understanding of human psychology" and a "lot of attention". He emerged triumphant gaining positive critical acclaim. The film had a positive response from both the critics as well as at the box-office, mainly due to its social and patriotic outlook.Akela in 1941, was another box-office success, with Mazhar being praised for his strong "emotional role" of a lonely man, and credited for carrying the picture to "success on his shoulders". The film was directed by Pesi Karani for producer Kikubhai Desai and co-starred Bibbo and E. Billimoria.

By January 1942, Mazhar had continuously worked for fourteen years in the film industry and acted in over 112 films. He directed his first film in 1942, called Meri Duniya on Hindu-Muslim unity, for National Artists, Bombay. Mazhar played a Sufi philosopher, with Hari Shivdasani and Kaushalya in lead roles. Mazhar set up his production company, Asiatic Pictures the same year, with the foundation ceremony for its maiden production Yad (Yaad) performed by V. Shantaram.  The heroine was new to Hindi\Urdu cinema though she had earlier acted in successful Punjabi films.

Under his new banner Mazhar Art Productions, Mazhar made Badi Baat (1944) and Pehli Nazar in 1945. Pehli Nazar introduced Munawwar Sultana to the Indian film industry. The film was directed by Mazhar, with story, dialogues and lyrics by Safdar "Aah". Singer Mukesh, who made his debut as a playback singer in 1941, in Nirdosh, gained popularity from Pehli Nazar, with the song, "Dil Jalta Hai Toh Jalne De" (Let The Heart Smolder), which became "an instant hit".

Personal life and death

Mazhar was, interested in sports and was reported to be "a boxer, a polo player, a football champ and an all-round athlete". Five feet, six inches in height, and weighing twelve stones, he was cited to have "an almost feminine grace". He generally played strong characters in films. Sushila Rani Patel stated in her interview with him that "Some of his outstanding performances were given in the following pictures: The Challenge, Madhuri,Nur Jeha, Sonera Sansa, Sultana, Baghi Sepahi and Akela. While in Padosi'', as "Thakur" the Hindu neighbour, Mazhar Khan, the Muslim actor, played the role of his lifetime". Mazhar was married to a Hindu lady, who did not convert to Islam after marriage. They had two sons, Anwar and Afsar.

Mazhar respected directors like Ezra Mir, S. F. Hasnain, A. R. Kardar, V. Shantaram, whom he described as a "genius in creative art", and Debaki Bose, who had the "vision of a philosopher".

Mazhar died at the age of 45 years in Mumbai, Maharashtra, India on 24 September 1950. His obituary remarked on his death as "a void left in the film industry at his untimely death", and "With the death of Mazhar Khan goes the power and passion of a histrionic artiste and all the remnants of a versatile character actor".

Filmography
List:

Silent films

Talkies

References

External links 

Rare Pictures of Mazhar Khan: https://www.flickr.com/photos/rashid_ashraf/31912669626/

1950 deaths
1905 births
Male actors in Hindi cinema
20th-century Indian male actors
Film producers from Uttar Pradesh
20th-century Indian film directors
People from Bareilly
Indian people of Pashtun descent
Male actors from Uttar Pradesh
Hindi film producers